Savatieria is a genus of sea snails, marine gastropod mollusks in the family Buccinidae.

Species
Species within the genus Savatieria include:
 Savatieria areolata Strebel, 1905
 Savatieria bertrandi Melvill & Standen, 1914
 Savatieria chordata Castellanos, Rolán & Bartolotta, 1987
 Savatieria coppingeri (E. A. Smith, 1881)
 Savatieria frigida Rochebrune & Mabille, 1885
 Savatieria meridionalis (E. A. Smith, 1881)
Species brought into synonymy
 Savatieria concinna Melvill & Standen, 1912: synonym of Savatieria areolata Strebel, 1905
 Savatieria dubia Strebel, 1905: synonym of Savatieria frigida Rochebrune & Mabille, 1885 
 Savatieria deseadensis Castellanos & Fernandez, 1975: synonym of Savatieria coppingeri (E. A. Smith, 1881)
 Savatieria molinae Strebel, 1905: synonym of Savatieria meridionalis (E. A. Smith, 1881)
 Savatieria pfefferi Strebel, 1905: synonym of Savatieria frigida Rochebrune & Mabille, 1885: synonym of Savatieria coppingeri (E. A. Smith, 1881)

References

 Castellanos, Z. J. A. de & Fernández, D. E. (1975). Acerca de las especies del genero Savatieria Roch. y Mab., 1885 (Moll. Gastropoda). Neotropica. 21 (65): 57–60.

External links
 Rochebrune A.-T. de & Mabille J. (1885). Diagnoses de mollusques nouveaux, recueillis par les membres de la mission du Cap Horn et M. Lebrun, Préparateur au Muséum, chargé d’une mission à Santa-Cruz de Patagonie. Bulletin de la Société Philomathique de Paris. ser.7, 9: 100-111.
 Linse, Katrin. The shelled Magellanic Mollusca: with special reference to biogeographic relations in the Southern Ocean. Vol. 34. ARG Gantner Verlag KG, 2002.
 Di Luca J. & Pastorino G. (2018). A revision of the genus Savatieria Rochebrune & Mabille, 1885: an endemic group of buccinulid gastropods from the Magellanic region. Journal of Molluscan Studies.

 
Gastropod genera